Opharus bimaculata is a moth of the family Erebidae. It was described by Hermann Dewitz in 1877. It is found in Puerto Rico, Guatemala, Costa Rica, Honduras, Venezuela and Brazil.

Subspecies
Opharus bimaculata bimaculata (Puerto Rico)
Opharus bimaculata major Rothschild, 1910 (Venezuela)

References

Opharus
Moths described in 1877
Moths of North America
Arctiinae of South America